This is a list of bridges and other crossings of the Saint Johns River.

Crossings

See also
 
 
 
 List of crossings of the Aucilla River
 List of crossings of the Halifax River
 List of crossings of the Ochlockonee River
 List of crossings of the Suwannee River

References

St. Johns River
St. Johns River

Crossings